Dusty is a nickname, sometimes of Dustin, which may refer to:

 Dusty Anderson (1918–2007), American actress and model
 Dusty Baker (born 1949), American former Major League Baseball player and manager
 Dusty Boggess (1904–1968), American Major League Baseball umpire
 Dusty Cooke (1907–1987), American Major League Baseball player
 Robert Edson Dornin (1912–1982), United States Navy officer and submarine commander
 Dusty Dvorak (born 1958), American former volleyball player
 Dusty Fletcher (1897–1954), African-American vaudeville performer
 Dustin Fletcher (born 1975), former Australian rules footballer
 Kyle Foggo (born 1954), US former CIA executive convicted of fraud
 Dusty Hare (born 1952), England rugby union footballer
 Dusty Harrison (born 1994), American boxer
 Dusty Hill (1949–2021), bassist and co-vocalist with the American rock group ZZ Top
 Dusty Hudock (born 1972), American retired soccer player
 Dusty Hughes (baseball) (born 1982), American former Major League Baseball pitcher
 Dustin Martin (born 1990), Australian rules footballer
 Dusty Miller (disambiguation)
 Dusty Redmon (born 1983), American guitarist
 Bob Rhoads (1879–1967), American Major League Baseball pitcher
 Dusty Rhodes (disambiguation)
 Barbara Roads (born 1928), American labor activist and flight attendant
 Dusty Watson, American drummer
 Dusty Wolfe (born 1962), American professional wrestler
 Dusty Zeigler (born 1973), American former National Football League player

See also 
 
 
 Dusty (given name)

Lists of people by nickname